The Chli Ruchen (2,944 m) is a mountain of the Glarus Alps, overlooking the Brunnital south of Unterschächen in the canton of Uri. It is located between the higher Gross Ruchen on the west and the Schärhorn on the east.

References

External links
Chli Ruchen on Hikr

Mountains of the Alps
Mountains of Switzerland
Mountains of the canton of Uri